Acanfora is a surname of Italian origin. Notable people with the surname include:

Joe Acanfora (born 1950), American educator and activist
Renato Acanfora (born 1957), Italian football player

Surnames of Italian origin